Harry Lee "Beans" Salmon (May 30, 1895 – April, 1983) was an American baseball pitcher in the Negro leagues. He played from 1920 to 1935 with several teams, playing mostly with the Birmingham Black Barons.

References

External links
 and Baseball-Reference Black Baseball stats and Seamheads

1895 births
1983 deaths
Birmingham Black Barons players
Homestead Grays players
Memphis Red Sox players
People from Warrior, Alabama
20th-century African-American sportspeople
Baseball pitchers